Lirapex is a genus of sea snails, marine gastropod mollusks in the family Peltospiridae.

Species
Species within the genus Lirapex include:
 Lirapex costellatus Warén & Bouchet, 2001
 Lirapex granularis Warén & Bouchet, 1989
 Lirapex humatus Warén & Bouchet, 2001
 Lirapex politus Chen, Zhou, Wang & Copley, 2017
Synonyms
 Lirapex costellata Warén & Bouchet, 1989: synonym of Lirapex costellatus Warén & Bouchet, 2001 (wrong grammatical agreement in original description)
 Lirapex humata Warén & Bouchet, 1989 : synonym of Lirapex humatus Warén & Bouchet, 1989 (wrong grammatical agreement in original description)

References

 Spencer, H.G., Marshall, B.A. & Willan, R.C. (2009). Checklist of New Zealand living Mollusca. Pp 196-219. in: Gordon, D.P. (ed.) New Zealand inventory of biodiversity. Volume one. Kingdom Animalia: Radiata, Lophotrochozoa, Deuterostomia. Canterbury University Press, Christchurch.

External links
 Warén A. & Bouchet P. (1989). New gastropods from East Pacific hydrothermal vents. Zoologica Scripta. 18(1): 67-102

Peltospiridae